'Clarke Pearmain', also called 'Golden Pearmain', 'Glouster Pearmain, 'Yellow Pearmain', and possibly the same as 'Columbian Russet', is a medium-sized apple cultivar. It was grown at Monticello by Thomas Jefferson.

See also
'King of the Pippins', also called 'Golden Winter Pearmain'

References

Apple cultivars